Anna May Waters, ARRC (21 January 1903 – 8 December 1987) was a Canadian nurse who served in World War II. Taken as a prisoner of war during the Japanese occupation of Hong Kong, she remained in captivity for fourteen months. Upon her release, Waters returned to Canada and was honoured with the Royal Red Cross. After her service in Canada, Waters moved to Hawaii, spending over a decade nursing lepers at Molokai.

Early life

Anna May Waters, known as May, was born on 21 January 1903, in Strathroy, Ontario, Canada to Mary (née McDonald) and David Waters. When she was eight years old, she moved with her parents and three brothers to Winnipeg, Manitoba. She was educated at Lord Roberts School and Kelvin High School, before entering nursing training. In 1927, Waters graduated from Winnipeg General Hospital as a registered nurse.

Career

Waters began nursing in December, 1927 at the Manitoba Tuberculosis Sanatorium in Ninette and remained there for two years. She then went to work in the Central Tuberculosis Clinic in Manitoba. In 1940, she enlisted in the Royal Canadian Army Medical Corps (RCAMC) and was appointed as the nursing-sister-in-charge of the Fort Osborne Military Hospital. On 27 October 1941, she became one of the first two nurses to serve in a battlefield area during World War II, when she and Kathleen Christie sailed aboard the HMT Awatea for Hong Kong with the Winnipeg Grenadiers. After stops in Honolulu and Manila the ship arrived in Kong Kong on 16 November. She was assigned to the malaria and dysentery wards of the hospital.

On December 8, when war was declared in the Pacific, the nurses moved to St. Albert's Convent. Within three days, they had established an Auxiliary Military Hospital at the convent and relocated all patients there. That same day, the first bombing of Hong Kong occurred, with the hospital taking seventeen direct hits. On Christmas Eve, rumors circulated that the colony had unconditionally surrendered to the Japanese forces and on Christmas day the Japanese occupation of Hong Kong began. On December 19, the St. Albert's Military Hospital was taken over by the Japanese. Though they were prisoners of war, the sisters continued to care for the patients under their charge until they were sent to Stanley Internment Camp in August 1942. After fourteen months of captivity, Waters was repatriated in 1943 to Canada.

Waters recuperated with her family for several months, trying to gain back the weight she had lost during her internment. She was presented with the Royal Red Cross, second class, on 6 April 1944, by Brigadier J. C. Stewart, commanding officer of military district 6. In June, she was honoured with the Colonial Hong Kong Gallantry Awards as a Royal Red Cross-Associate (ARRC). On 5 September 1945, she was shipped out to rejoin her unit as part of the staff on the TSS Letitia  and was briefly reunited with some of her fellow former POWs in Hawaii in October. She served on the Letitia, a hospital ship operating in the Atlantic and Pacific war theatres, until August 1946.

When she was discharged from the RCAMC, Waters returned to Winnipeg and remained until September 1950, when she went to work at the Oregon State Tuberculosis Hospital in Salem, Oregon. After serving for a year, she moved to Honolulu to work at the Leahi Hospital for tubercular patients. In October 1952, she returned to Manitoba to care for her ailing father, who died in 1955. In April 1956, Waters returned to Hawaii, where she nursed on the island of Molokai at the Kalaupapa Leprosy Settlement. In 1968 Waters retired and moved to Long Beach, California, where one of her brothers was living.

Death and legacy

Waters died on 8 December 1987 in Long Beach, California and was buried in Westminster Memorial Park cemetery on 12 December 1987.

References

Citations

Bibliography

 
 
 
 
  and  
 

 

1903 births
1987 deaths
People from Strathroy-Caradoc
Canadian military nurses
Female wartime nurses
Canadian people of World War II
Canadian expatriates in Hong Kong
Canadian expatriates in the United States
Canadian women nurses